The Colorado State University College of Agricultural Sciences includes five academic departments and offers nine undergraduate majors with many concentration options as well as multiple graduate degree programs. People in the College of Agricultural Sciences lead research and design projects in food production, security, and safety, ecosystem health, landscape design, and human well-being. They also provide extension and participate in engagement in agricultural sciences and landscape architecture.

Academic Departments
The College is organized into five academic departments:

Department of Agricultural and Resource Economics
Department of Agricultural Biology
Department of Animal Sciences
Department of Horticulture and Landscape Architecture
Department of Soil and Crop Sciences

Undergraduate Majors
The College offers many concentration options in the following nine majors:

Agricultural Biology (concentrations in Entomology, Plant Pathology, and Weed Science) 
Agricultural Business (concentrations in Agricultural Economics, Farm and Ranch Management, and Food Systems)
Agricultural Education (concentrations in Teacher Development and Agricultural Literacy)
Animal Science 
Environmental Horticulture (concentrations in Landscape Business, Nursery and Landscape Management, Landscape Design and Contracting, and Turf Management) 
Equine Science 
Horticulture (concentrations in Floriculture, Horticultural Science, Horticultural Business Management, Horticultural Therapy, and Horticultural Food Crops)
Landscape Architecture
Soil and Crop Sciences (concentrations in Agronomic Production Management, Applied Information Technology, Soil Ecology, Soil Restoration and Conservation, International Soil and Crops Sciences, and Plant Biotechnology, Genetics and Breeding),

Students can also take several online courses offered by the faculty in the College of Agricultural Sciences and can earn undergraduate degrees in agricultural sciences online  including programs in: 

Agricultural Business
Environmental and Natural Resource Economics
Horticulture

Graduate programs
The College offers Master of Agriculture, Master of Science, and  Doctor of Philosophy (Ph.D.) degrees in multiple areas. The graduate degree programs include: 

Agricultural Biology (M.S. and Ph.D), including specializations in Entomology, Plant Pathology, and Weed Science (Formerly Bioagricultural Sciences and Pest Management)
Agricultural and Resource Economics (M.S.)
Agricultural Sciences (M.Agr.), including specializations in Integrated Resource Management and Teacher Development 
Animal Sciences (M.S. and Ph.D)
Extension Education (M.Ext.Ed.)
Horticulture (M.S. and Ph.D.)
Horticulture and Human Health (M.S.)
Pest Management M.S.
Soil and Crop Sciences (M.S. and Ph.D.)

The Agricultural Sciences degree is also offered as a hybrid in person / online degree, with classes meeting in Denver

Faculty in the College of Agricultural Sciences also train in cross-campus graduate degree programs, including training for M.S. and Ph.D. degrees in: 

Cell and Molecular Biology
Ecology

A Teaching in Extension graduate certificate is also offered by the college. 

Multiple graduate courses are offered online by faculty in the College of Agricultural Sciences. The available certificate programs include: 
Applied Global Stability
Horticulture and Human Health
Urban Agriculture

Professional Development Programs

CSU also offers multiple online professional development programs for people interested in food and agriculture, including: 

Certified Gardener
Food Manufacturing Safety and Sanitation
Land Stewardship
Native Plants in the Landscape
Spanish for Animal Health and Care Fields
Understanding Climate Change

Research
Faculty, staff, and students perform research in food safety, human-disease prevention characteristics of food crops, livestock and the environment, renewable energy, no-till cropping systems, risk management for farmers and ranchers, plant adaptation and breeding, plant health, entomology, and organic agriculture. The college is noted for providing opportunities for undergraduate students to conduct research and for developing research projects in cooperation with farmers, food manufacturers, and those working in agricultural technology to improve food security and safety.

The college is home to numerous multi-investigator research programs dedicated to improving food security and safety, ecosystem health, and human well-being, such as the Soil Carbon Solutions Center and the International Weed Genomics Consortium. Research is performed in laboratory facilities in Fort Collins as well as at CSU agricultural experiment stations across Colorado.

Extension and Engagement
Faculty, staff, and students in the College of Agricultural Sciences contribute extensively to extension and engagement in agricultural sciences and education. Some notable programs include the Temple Grandin Equine Center, the Colorado Food Systems Program, the Plant Select Program, and the Plant Diagnostic Clinic.

References

Colorado State University
Agricultural universities and colleges in the United States